Girl Playing the Lute is a marble sculpture by Adolf von Hildebrand. It is part of the collection of Alte Nationalgalerie in Berlin, Germany.

References

External links

 

Marble sculptures in Germany
Musical instruments in art
Sculptures of women in Germany
Statues in Germany